"God Don't Never Change" is a gospel blues song recorded by Blind Willie Johnson in 1929. The song is sometimes titled "God Don't Ever Change".

Lyrics 

The verses include allusions to:
 Psalm 114:4 "The mountains skipped like rams, and the little hills like lambs".
 Amen Corner, that part of a church where the most vocally devout worshipers congregate, as in the poem "Trouble in the Amen Corner".
 The influenza pandemic of 191820. The topicality of that event suggests that Johnson wrote at least that verse. Unless and until an earlier version can be found, he can be credited with both the tune and the words.

Other recordings 

 1990Glenn Kaiser and Darrell Mansfield, on the album Trimmed and Burnin.
 1991Russ Taff, on the album Under Their Influence
 1994Tom Shaka, on the album Hot'N Spicey
 1995Catfish Keith, on the album Fresh Catfish
 1996"God Don't Ever Change" by Cissy Houston on the album Face To Face
 1997Jimmy Vivino, on the album Do What, Now? 1999Knut Reiersrud, on the album Sub 2002Cary Hudson, on the album The Phoenix 2002Max Ochs, on the album Letter to the Editor 
 2009Ashley Cleveland, on the album God Don't Never Change 
 2009The Radiators, on the album 10/09/09 New Orleans, LA Tipitinas 2014Levon Helm Band, on the album The Midnight Ramble Sessions, Vol. 3 2016Lucinda Williams, on the various artists' album God Don't Never Change: The Songs of Blind Willie Johnson''

References 

Blind Willie Johnson songs
1929 songs
Gospel songs
Songwriter unknown